Season 1879–80 was the third in which Hibernian competed at a Scottish national level, entering the Scottish Cup for the third time.

Overview 

Hibs reached the quarter-final of the Scottish Cup, losing 6–2 to Dumbarton.

Hibs defeated Edinburgh derby rivals Hearts in the third round, in a match played at Mayfield Park, in the Mayfield area of Edinburgh.

Results 

All results are written with Hibs' score first.

Scottish Cup

See also
List of Hibernian F.C. seasons

References

External links 
 Results For Season 1879/1880 in All Competitions, www.ihibs.co.uk

Hibernian F.C. seasons
Hibernian